Starokraychikovo is a rural locality (a selo) in Akulovsky Selsoviet, Pervomaysky District, Altai Krai, Russia. The population was 168 as of 2013. There are 4 streets.

Geography 
Starokraychikovo is located 74 km north of Novoaltaysk (the district's administrative centre) by road. Inyushovo is the nearest rural locality.

References 

Rural localities in Pervomaysky District, Altai Krai